Bacillus pseudalcalophilus is a facultative anaerobe bacterium. It is a gram positive, alkaliphilic and alkalitolerant, aerobic endospore-forming bacteria.

References

External links
UniProt entry

pseudalcalophilus